Perfect rhyme—also called full rhyme, exact rhyme, or true rhyme—is a form of rhyme between two words or phrases, satisfying the following conditions:

 The stressed vowel sound in both words must be identical, as well as any subsequent sounds.  For example, the words "trouble" and "bubble" (from Shakespeare's Macbeth) form a perfect rhyme.
 The onset of the stressed syllable in the words must differ.  For example, "bean" and "green" is a perfect rhyme, while "leave" and "believe" is not.

Word pairs that satisfy the first condition but not the second (such as the aforementioned "leave" and "believe") are technically identities (also known as identical rhymes or identicals). Homophones, being words of different meaning but identical pronunciation, are an example of identical rhyme.

Imperfect rhyme

Half rhyme or imperfect rhyme, sometimes called near-rhyme, lazy rhyme, or slant rhyme, is a type of rhyme formed by words with similar but not identical sounds. In most instances, either the vowel segments are different while the consonants are identical, or vice versa. This type of rhyme is also called approximate rhyme, inexact rhyme, imperfect rhyme (in contrast to perfect rhyme), off rhyme, analyzed rhyme, suspended rhyme, or sprung rhyme.

Use in popular music

Rock and punk
In the 1977 song "God Save the Queen" by the English punk rock band the Sex Pistols, the authors create a rhyme with the lines "God save the queen" and "the fascist regime".

Hip hop and rap

Half rhyme is often used, along with assonance, in rap music. This can be used to avoid rhyming clichés (e.g., rhyming "knowledge" with "college") or obvious rhymes, and gives the writer greater freedom and flexibility in forming lines of verse. Additionally, some words have no perfect rhyme in English, necessitating the use of slant rhyme.  The use of half rhyme may also enable the construction of longer multisyllabic rhymes than otherwise possible.

In the following lines from the song "N.Y. State of Mind" by rapper Nas, the author uses half rhyme in a complex cross rhyme pattern:

And be prosperous, though we live dangerous
Cops could just arrest me, blamin' us, we're held like hostages

Unconventional exceptions
Children's nursery rhyme This Little Piggy displays an unconventional case of slant rhyme. "Home" is rhymed with "none".

This little piggy stayed (at) home...this little piggy had none.

In The Hives's song "Dead Quote Olympics", singer Howlin' Pelle Almqvist rhymes "idea" with "library":

This time you really got something, it's such a clever idea
 But it doesn't mean it's good because you found it at the libra-ri-a

The Chuck Berry song "Let It Rock" (1960) rhymes "Alabama" with "hammer":

In the heat of the day down in Mobile, Alabama
Workin' on the railroad with a steel drivin' hamma

See also
 Holorime
 Internal rhyme
 Monorhyme
 Rime riche

General and cited references 
 Smith, M., Joshi, A. (2020). Rhymes in the Flow: How Rappers Flip the Beat. United States: University of Michigan Press.
 The Princeton Handbook of Poetic Terms: Third Edition. (2016). United States: Princeton University Press.
 Lasser, M. (2019). City Songs and American Life, 1900-1950. United Kingdom: University of Rochester Press.
 Barnes, W. (1854). A Philological Grammar: Grounded Upon English, and Formed from a Comparison of More Than Sixty Languages. Being an Introduction to the Science of Grammar and a Help to Grammars of All Languages, Especially English, Latin and Greek. United Kingdom: J. R. Smith.
 Stoker, J. (2015). Slant Rhyme. United Kingdom: Xlibris US.

Citations 

Rhyme